Charles Michael Puleo (born February 7, 1955) is a retired Major League Baseball pitcher who played from 1981 to 1989 with the New York Mets, Cincinnati Reds and Atlanta Braves.

Puleo played baseball at Bloomfield High School.

Puleo is probably best remembered for being the pitcher the Mets traded in order to reacquire Tom Seaver before the 1983 season.

Puleo later went on to be a gym teacher at William Blount High School and has since retired.

Puleo is married and the father of two girls.

References

External links

1955 births
Atlanta Braves players
Baseball players from New Jersey
Bloomfield High School (New Jersey) alumni
Cincinnati Reds players
Living people
New York Mets players
People from Bloomfield, New Jersey
People from Glen Ridge, New Jersey
Seton Hall Pirates baseball players
Sportspeople from Essex County, New Jersey
Denver Zephyrs players
Dunedin Blue Jays players
Greenville Braves players
Knoxville Blue Jays players
Richmond Braves players
Tidewater Tides players
Utica Blue Jays players
Wichita Aeros players